This is the discography of English singer Tina Charles.

Albums

Studio albums

Compilation albums

Singles

References

Discographies of British artists
Disco discographies